HMS Cosby was a Buckley-class Captain-class frigate during World War II, it was named after Captain Phillips Cosby (1727–1808) of  during the American Revolutionary War.

Originally destined for the US Navy HMS Cosby was provisionally given the name USS Reeves (later this name was reassigned to DE 156), however the delivery was diverted to the Royal Navy before the launch.

General information
HMS Cosby served with the Nore Command and the Devonport Command earning battle honours for service in the English Channel, North Foreland and North Sea.

Pennant (UK): K 559
Pennant (US): DE 94
Built by: Bethlehem-Hingham Shipyard Inc. (Hingham, Massachusetts, U.S.A.)

References
 The Captain Class Frigates in the Second World War by Donald Collingwood. published by Leo Cooper (1998), .
 The Buckley-Class Destroyer Escorts by Bruce Hampton Franklin, published by Chatham Publishing (1999), .

External links
 Uboat.net page for HMS Cosby
 captainclassfrigates.co.uk

Captain-class frigates
Buckley-class destroyer escorts
World War II frigates of the United Kingdom
Ships built in Hingham, Massachusetts
1943 ships